Rudolpho A. "Tony" Jaramillo (born August 16, 1978) is a former assistant hitting coach for the Cincinnati Reds of Major League Baseball.

In 1985, Jarmaillo's parents were arrested for distributing heroin. He was raised by his uncle, Rudy Jaramillo, in the Oak Cliff neighborhood of Dallas.

Jaramillo played in Minor League Baseball from 1998 through 2003. He then became a minor league coach, and joined the Reds organization in 2008. He spent the 2013 through 2015 seasons with the Louisville Bats of the Class AAA International League. After the 2015 season, the Reds promoted him to their major league coaching staff as assistant hitting coach.

References

External links

Living people
1978 births
Baseball players from Dallas
Pulaski Rangers players
Springfield Capitals players
Tyler Roughnecks players
Fort Worth Cats players
San Angelo Colts players
Rio Grande Valley WhiteWings players
Minor league baseball coaches
Cincinnati Reds coaches
Major League Baseball hitting coaches